An election was held in the Australian state of Queensland on 7 February 2004 to elect the 89 members of the state's Legislative Assembly.

The Labor Party (ALP) government of Premier Peter Beattie won a third term in office, with its large majority almost untouched.

Key dates

Results

The Nationals regained three seats from Labor — Burdekin, Burnett and Charters Towers — as well as Lockyer from One Nation member Bill Flynn, but lost Keppel to Labor, leaving them with a total gain of three seats. The Liberal Party won Currumbin from Minister Merri Rose, as well as taking Rob Borbidge's former seat of Surfers Paradise from independent Lex Bell, who had won it in the 2001 by-election following Borbidge's resignation.

|}

Seats changing hands

Post-election pendulum

Subsequent changes
In 2005, Deputy Premier Terry Mackenroth and Speaker Ray Hollis resigned from parliament, forcing by-elections in their former seats of Chatsworth and Redcliffe on 20 August 2005. The Liberal Party  won both seats, with Michael Caltabiano successful in Chatsworth and Terry Rogers in Redcliffe. ALP member Robert Poole resigned from his seat of Gaven on 28 February 2006. National Party candidate Dr Alex Douglas won the Gaven by-election held on 1 April 2006.

The results of the three by-elections left Labor with 60 seats and lift National and Liberal Party representation to 16 and seven seats respectively.

References

See also
Candidates of the Queensland state election, 2004
Members of the Queensland Legislative Assembly, 2001–2004
Members of the Queensland Legislative Assembly, 2004–2006
Beattie Ministry

Elections in Queensland
2004 elections in Australia
2000s in Queensland
February 2004 events in Australia